The Death of Mario Ricci is a 1983 Swiss-French drama film directed by Claude Goretta. It was entered into the 1983 Cannes Film Festival where Gian Maria Volonté won the award for Best Actor.

Cast
 Gian Maria Volonté - Bernard Fontana
 Magali Noël - Solange
 Heinz Bennent - Henri Kremer
 Mimsy Farmer - Cathy Burns
 Jean-Michel Dupuis - Didier Meylan
 Michel Robin - Fernand Blondel
 Lucas Belvaux - Stephane Coutaz
 Claudio Caramaschi - Giuseppe Cardetti
 Roger Jendly - Francis
 Bernard-Pierre Donnadieu - Jacky Vermot
 Michel Cassagne - Armand Barbezat
 Michael Hinz - Otto Schmidhauser
 Marblum Jequier - Odette Simonet
 Jean-Claude Perrin - Edgar Simonet
 André Schmidt - Maurice Coutaz

References

External links

1983 films
Swiss drama films
French drama films
1980s French-language films
1983 drama films
Films about journalists
Films directed by Claude Goretta
Films set in Switzerland
French-language Swiss films
1980s French films